Terrance George Reardon (April 6, 1919 – February 14, 1993) was a Canadian ice hockey centre and coach. He played in the National Hockey League with the Boston Bruins and Montreal Canadiens between 1939 and 1947

Reardon played 197 games in the National Hockey League and coached 794 games in the American Hockey League. He played with the Montreal Canadiens and Boston Bruins. Boston engraved his name on the Stanley Cup in 1939, even though he only played four regular season games with the club. Reardon won the Stanley Cup again in 1941 with the Bruins as a full-time member.

His brother, Ken Reardon, played in the NHL with the Montreal Canadiens winning the Stanley Cup in 1946, and is a member of the Hockey Hall of Fame. Terry and Ken faced each other in the 1946 Stanley Cup Finals, making them one of the few sets of brothers to do so in the Stanley Cup Finals, and the two even dropped gloves against each other at one point.

Career statistics

Regular season and playoffs

Awards and achievements
MJHL Scoring Champion (1938)
Stanley Cup Championship (1939, 1941)
Calder Cup (AHL) Championships (1949 & 1956)
AHL Coach of the Year (1971)
Honoured Member of the Manitoba Hockey Hall of Fame

References

External links

Terry Reardon's biography at Manitoba Hockey Hall of Fame

1919 births
1993 deaths
Boston Bruins players
Brandon Wheat Kings players
Canadian expatriates in the United States
Canadian ice hockey centres
Hershey Bears players
Kildonan North Stars players
Montreal Canadiens players
Providence Reds players
Ice hockey people from Winnipeg
St. Boniface Seals players
Stanley Cup champions